Sevasi is a town in Vadodara.

External links
 https://www.panoramio.com/photo/34129888

Cities and towns in Vadodara district